Lawrence C. Crute (died 1930) was a state legislator in Arkansas. He served in the Arkansas House of Representatives in 1873 representing Chicot County.

He is listed in the Arkansas State Land Records in June 1871.

He was elected in a special election November 4, 1873. He donated to the Baptist Home Mission in 1885.

See also
African-American officeholders during and following the Reconstruction era

References

Members of the Arkansas House of Representatives
Year of birth missing
1930 deaths